Cyligramma conradsi is a moth of the family Noctuidae. This moth species is commonly found in Tanzania.

References

Endemic fauna of Tanzania
Catocalinae
Insects of Tanzania
Owlet moths of Africa